Zeytun (also Romanized as Zeytūn) is a village in Rostam-e Do Rural District, in the Central District of Rostam County, Fars Province, Iran. At the 2006 census, its population was 50, in 10 families.

References

Populated places in Rostam County